Sailaab may refer to:

 Sailaab (1956 film), a Hindi film
 Sailaab (1990 film), a Bollywood suspense thriller film
 Sailaab (TV series), an Indian television series